NGC 4945 (also known as Caldwell 83) is a barred spiral galaxy in the constellation Centaurus, visible near the  star Xi Centauri. The galaxy was discovered by James Dunlop in 1826 and is thought to be similar to the Milky Way Galaxy, although X-ray observations show that NGC 4945 has an unusual energetic Seyfert 2 nucleus that might house a supermassive black hole. Around the nucleus of the galaxy, there is a dense disk of dust and gas, along with many dense star clusters.

Galaxy group

NGC 4945 one of the brightest galaxies of the Centaurus A/M83 Group, a large, nearby group of galaxies.  The galaxy is the second brightest galaxy in the subgroup centered on Centaurus A.

In popular culture
NGC 4945 is the title of a song by Brett Domino on the album "Funk".

References

External links

 
 APOD: Nearby Spiral Galaxy NGC 4945 (7/21/02)
 ESO: The milkyway's nearby cousin (2/10/09)

Barred spiral galaxies
Centaurus A/M83 Group
Centaurus (constellation)
4945
45279
083b
Astronomical objects discovered in 1826